Pit Seng Low (born 9 May 1995) is an Australian badminton player. He won the men's doubles title at the 2015 New Caledonia International tournament partnered with Anthony Joe. Low was the gold medalist at the 2017 Oceania Championships in the men's singles event.

Achievements

Oceania Championships 
Men's singles

Men's doubles

BWF International Challenge/Series 
Men's doubles

Mixed doubles

  BWF International Challenge tournament
  BWF International Series tournament
  BWF Future Series tournament

References

External links 
 

Living people
1995 births
Australian people of Chinese descent
Sportsmen from New South Wales
Australian male badminton players